The Apollo Marine Park (previously known as the Apollo Commonwealth Marine Reserve) is an Australian Marine Park located in Bass Strait off the coast of Victoria and near Tasmania's King Island. It is managed as part of the South-east Marine Parks Network.

One of the reserve's features includes the Otway Depression, a 100 m deep undersea valley joining the Bass Basin to the open ocean. This valley was an outlet channel for the ancient Bass Lake and mainland river systems, which existed during the last ice age.

Protection
The Apollo Marine Park has been assigned IUCN protected area category VI and is wholly zoned as 'Multiple Use'.

The following table is a summary of the 'Multiple Use Zone' of the marine park:

Shipwrecks
The MS City of Rayville is located within the marine reserve near Cape Otway. It was the first American vessel sunk during World War II.

See also

Protected areas of Australia

Notes

References

External links
 South-east Marine Parks Network Website

Australian marine parks
Protected areas established in 2007